Jean Vaysse (28 April 1900 – 17 October 1974) was a French rugby union player who competed in the 1924 Summer Olympics. He was born in Albi and died in Albi. In 1924 he won the silver medal as member of the French team.

References

External links
 
 
 
 

1900 births
1974 deaths
Sportspeople from Albi
French rugby union players
Olympic rugby union players of France
Rugby union players at the 1924 Summer Olympics
Olympic silver medalists for France
France international rugby union players
Medalists at the 1924 Summer Olympics